State Road 117 (SR 117) is a  state highway in Jacksonville, Florida. It is known as Norwood Avenue for its entire length.

Route description 
SR 117 is located just north of downtown Jacksonville. It begins at SR 122 (Golfair Boulevard) in the Brentwood section of the city. SR 117 is known as Norwood Avenue. Going north, the highway passes the Holy Rosary Catholic Road and School before coming to an intersection with 44th Street, where a shopping center is located. After this complex, SR 117 runs through a residential area named Norwood before terminating at Interstate 95 (I-95) and being replaced by Lem Turner Boulevard (SR 115).

Major intersections

References

117
117
117